The women's pole vault event at the 2015 Asian Athletics Championships was held on June 6.

Results

References

Pole
Pole vault at the Asian Athletics Championships
2015 in women's athletics